Professor John Grange (born 4 April 1943 at East Dereham, Norfolk) died 10 October 2016 was an English immunologist, epidemiologist, researcher, and academic, and was one of Europe's leading tuberculosis specialists.

Education
Grange was educated at Gresham's School, Holt, Norfolk, and then from 1962 to 1967 at the Middlesex Hospital Medical School of the University of London.

Career
After qualification as a physician, Grange joined the Research Department at the Middlesex Hospital, where he studied the genus Mycobacterium and the diseases it causes in humans and other animals. This followed a stay in Zaire to study the Buruli ulcer. His doctoral thesis was on the classification of certain rapidly growing mycobacteria and led to research on the development of bacteriophage typing of mycobacteria for epidemiology.
 
Next he was appointed Reader in Microbiology at the National Heart and Lung Institute, where his interests turned to the immunology and epidemiology of tuberculosis. From there he became assistant lecturer (1969-1970) at the Bland Sutton Institute of Pathology of Middlesex Hospital Medical School, University of London and then lecturer in the same school's Department of Microbiology from 1971 to 1976.

From 1976 to 2000, Grange was Reader in Clinical Microbiology at the Imperial College School of Medicine and honorary consultant Microbiologist to the Royal Brompton NHS Trust.

Between 1978 and 1995, he undertook a series of visits to Indonesia to pursue research into the immunology and epidemiology of tuberculosis.

From 1985 to 1995, he was an honorary research fellow at King's College Hospital Medical School. After retirement from ICL he became a Visiting Professor at the University College London Centre for Infectious Disease and International Health.

In recent years, Grange's interests have turned to the causes of the world tuberculosis pandemic - poverty, inequity and injustice. He retired early from Imperial College London and to work for the British charity TB Alert, the Consultation on Health of the World Council of Churches and the International Society for Human Values.

Career related activities
 Member of the International Union Against Tuberculosis and Lung Disease 
 Founder member of the European Society for Mycobacteriology 
 Founder, TB Alert, 1998
 Trustee, TB Alert, 1998-2000 
 Member, Scientific Advisory Board of TB Alert, 2001 to date 
 President, TB Focus since 2000 
 Editor of Tubercle, 1990-1992
 Associate Editor of Tubercle and Lung Disease, 1992-1997 
 Associate Editor of International Journal of Tuberculosis and Lung Disease 1997-1999 
 Member of editorial board of Journal of Applied Bacteriology 1985-1990.

Degrees
1967 - Bachelor of Medicine (London) 
1967 - Bachelor of Surgery (London) 
1974 - Doctor of Medicine (London) 
1981 - Master of Science, Immunology (London)

Sources

1943 births
British immunologists
Living people
People educated at Gresham's School
Academics of Imperial College London
Academics of University College London
People from Dereham